The KK100, formerly known as Kingkey 100 and Kingkey Finance Tower, is a supertall skyscraper in Shenzhen, Guangdong.

Location
It is located on Shennan East Road and within Caiwuwei, an area often described as the 'financial district' of Shenzhen. It belongs to Shenzhen's Luohu District and is situated east of Lizhi Park, approximately one kilometer north of the border between mainland China and Hong Kong.

The mixed-use building rises  and contains 98 floors for office space and a hotel.
Adjacent to KK100 is the KK Mall, which opened its doors November 26, 2010, and contains luxury brand stores, restaurants and a supermarket. The KK Mall also hosts Shenzhen's first IMAX cinema.

The St. Regis Hotel occupies floors 75 to 100 of the main tower, which opened in September 2011.

The lobby of the St. Regis Hotel is in 96th floor of this building. There are 4 elevators ride between 1st and 96th floor (2 elevators stop 1,5,96 and another 2 elevators stop 1,96). These 4 elevators are made by Mitsubishi which can ride to 9 m/s (1800 FPM)

It is currently the second tallest building in Shenzhen as well as being the 14th tallest building in the world. It is the tallest building ever designed by a British architect.

There is a water fountain in front of the building, and an observation deck near the top.
In December 2011, the Emporis Skyscraper Award awarded the building a fourth place.

The building has a height-width ratio of 9.5:1, thus becoming one of China's slimmest buildings.

Image gallery

See also 

 List of tallest buildings in Shenzhen
 List of tallest buildings in China
 List of tallest buildings in the world
 List of buildings with 100 floors or more

References

External links

 Kingkey 100 on CTBUH Skyscraper Center

Hotel buildings completed in 2011
Office buildings completed in 2011
Skyscraper office buildings in Shenzhen
2011 establishments in China
Terry Farrell buildings
Skyscraper hotels in Shenzhen